Günter Faltin (born 25 November 1944) is a German economist and entrepreneur.

Early life and education
Gunter Faltin was born on 25 November 1944 in Bamberg, Germany. He graduated with a Dr. rer.soc. from the University of Konstanz in 1972.

Career

Academia
In 1977 he became Professor of Economics at the Free University of Berlin, where he established the entrepreneurship department. Since 2013 he has been teaching as visiting professor at Chiang Mai University.

He was appointed for several years visiting professor to Asia by the German Academic Exchange Service. He gave lectures and workshops on entrepreneurship in many countries, among them the US, Canada, Mexico, Brazil, Russia, South Korea, and Japan. From 1984 to 1988 he was deputy president of the German Society for Education, Invention and Innovation,(DABEI) Berlin Section.

In 1999 he founded the Entrepreneurship Lab at Free University of Berlin, which was adopted by Volkswagen's "Innovationscampus Wolfsburg" in 2000.  From 2000 - 2003 he served as an expert for the project "Entrepreneurship in Education and Training in Russia and Ukraine", he conducted a series of workshops for the European Union's European Training Foundation in St. Petersburg and Kiev from 2000 to 2003. In 2010 he followed an invitation of the government of Bhutan for a keynote to the conference on “High Tech and Entrepreneurship".

Business
In 1985, he founded the Projektwerkstatt GmbH, based on the "Teekampagne" ("tea campaign"). The  "Teekampagne" is the world's largest importer of Darjeeling leaf tea, according to the Tea Board of India. In 1992 Faltin launched and sponsored the reforestation project S.E.R.V.E. ("Save the Environment & Regenerate Vital Employment"); the WWF is taking charge of the project on location in Darjeeling, India. Faltin is business angel and coach of startup companies such as eBuero AG (2001), RatioDrink AG  (2006), and Waschkampagne.

In 2001 he established the Stiftung Entrepreneurship, a foundation aimed at furthering entrepreneurship and hosting the yearly "Entrepreneurship Summit".

Teachings
Central to Faltin's teachings is that entrepreneurship today is available to everybody, not just for those with capital and patents. He dissociates clearly entrepreneurship from business administration. In a postindustrial society a well thought out entrepreneurial design is more decisive for the success of a start-up company than having much capital.

Recognition
Faltin has earned the following awards and honours:
 1997: Award by Price-Babson-Foundation, Boston, "For Bringing Entrepreneurial Vitality to Academe"
 2007: Vision Award for Entrepreneurship
 2009: Deutscher Gründerpreis: Special Award for "Teekampagne"
 2010: Cross of Merit of the Federal Republic of Germany, for his pioneer work on entrepreneurship in Germany
 2018: Dr. h. c. of the State University of Tiflis

Publications 
In his best-selling book Brain Versus Capital (English translation 2013, original title Kopf schlägt Kapital), he proposes a radically new approach to generating entrepreneurial ventures with an emphasis on ecologically and culturally sensitive issues.

 Bildung und Einkommenserzielung: Das Defizit: Unternehmerische Qualifikationen. In: Axt/Karcher/Schleich: Ausbildungs-oder Beschäftigungskrise in der Dritten Welt? Frankfurt o. M. (1987)
The University and Entrepreneurship In: Education in Transition. Wiesbaden (1992)
 Reichtum von unten, (G. Faltin und J. Zimmer, Berlin 2. Ed 1996). Greek Ed. 2004
 Das Netz weiter werfen - Für eine neue Kultur unternehmerischen Handelns In: Faltin/Ripsas/Zimmer (Ed.) "Entrepreneurship. Wie aus Ideen Unternehmen werden". Munich (1998)
 Competencies for Innovative Entrepreneurship, In Adult Learning and the Future of Work, Unesco Institute for Education, Hamburg,(1999)
 Creating a Culture of Innovative Entrepreneurship In: Journal of International Business and Economy, Vol. 2, No. 1, (2001)
 Für eine Kultur des Unternehmerischen – Entrepreneurship als Qualifikation der Zukunft In: Leistung – Lust & Last Bucher/Lauermann/Walcher (Ed..). Vienna (2005)
 Erfolgreich gründen. Der Unternehmer als Künstler und Komponist. DIHK, Berlin (2007)
 Kopf schlägt Kapital. Die ganz andere Art, ein Unternehmen zu gründen. Von der Lust, ein Entrepreneur zu sein. Carl Hanser Verlag, Munich, 2008
 Kopf schlägt Kapital. Audio Book (7 compact discs), spoken by Stephan Reimertz, 2009
 Brain versus Capital Stiftung Entrepreneurship, Berlin, 2013
 Entrepreneurship als innovativer Prozess – von Anfangsideen, konzept-kreativen Gründern und der Entrepreneurial Society In: Peter Drucker - der Mann, der das Management geprägt hat: Erinnerungen und Ausblick zum 100. Geburtstag; Hermann Doppler, Markus Eurich, Günter Faltin, et al., Winfried W. Weber (Herausgeber); Sordon Verlag, 2009
 Wir sind das Kapital. Erkenne den Entrepreneur in dir. Aufbruch in eine intelligente Ökonomie. Murmann Verlag, Hamburg, 2015
 Handbuch Entrepreneurship. Springer Gabler, Wiesbaden 2018.

Criticism 

Faltin is mentor to (Michael Silberberger ), a German serial entrepreneur, who has received criticism for exploiting the Berlin rental estate Market for capitalistic purposes, together with Holger Johnson's (Dornröschen GmbH & Co. KG ).

Notes

External links
 Teekampagne
 Boston Tea Campaign, an offspring of Teekampagne
 Entrepreneurship Blog
 Freie Universität Berlin, Arbeitsbereich Entrepreneurship

1944 births
People from Bamberg
Living people
German economists
Businesspeople from Bavaria
Recipients of the Cross of the Order of Merit of the Federal Republic of Germany